Poland competed at the Summer Olympic Games for the first time at the 1924 Summer Olympics in Paris, France. 65 competitors, 64 men and 1 woman, took part in 38 events in 10 sports.

Medalists

| width="78%" align="left" valign="top" |

Athletics

Fourteen athletes represented Poland in 1924. It was the nation's debut appearance in the sport as well as the Games.

Ranks given are within the heat.

Boxing 

Five boxers represented Poland at the 1924 Games. It was the nation's debut in the sport as well as the Games. None of the Polish boxers advanced past the first bout.

Cycling

Eight cyclists represented Poland in 1924. It was the nation's debut in the sport as well as the Games. The pursuit team won the silver medal. Lange, a member of the team, also placed fifth in the 50 kilometres.

Road cycling

Track cycling

Ranks given are within the heat.

Equestrian

Six equestrians represented Poland in 1924. It was the nation's debut in the sport as well as the Games. Królikiewicz won the country's first equestrian medal with the bronze in the jumping competition.

Fencing

Five fencers, four men and one woman, represented Poland in 1924. It was the nation's debut in the sport; Poland was one of nine nations to send women to the first Olympic women's fencing competition.

 Men

Ranks given are within the pool.

 Women

Ranks given are within the pool.

Football

Poland competed in the Olympic football tournament for the first time in 1924.

 Round 1

Final rank 17th place

Rowing

Six rowers represented Poland in 1924. It was the nation's debut in the sport.

Ranks given are within the heat.

Sailing

A single sailor represented Poland in 1924. It was the nation's debut in the sport as well as the Games.

Shooting

Seven sport shooters represented Poland in 1924.

Wrestling

Greco-Roman
 Men's

References

External links
Official Olympic Reports
International Olympic Committee results database

Nations at the 1924 Summer Olympics
1924
1924 in Polish sport